Grigsby is an English surname derived from the name of a "lost" medieval village in Lincolnshire recorded in the Domesday Book as "Gredbi", which was itself a development of the Old Norse "Griot-byr". The spelling "Grigsby" is believed to stem from a common progenitor, John Grigsby (1623–1730). Most Grigsbys in the United States trace their descent from this 17th-century landowner, in Stafford County, Virginia.

Notable people named Grigsby
 Andrew Jackson Grigsby, colonel for the Stonewall Brigade for the Confederate States Army in the American Civil War, and commander in the Battle of Antietam
 Beverly Grigsby, American musician
 Bill Grigsby, announcer for the Kansas City Chiefs
 Boomer Grigsby, American football fullback
 Charles Grigsby, American Idol contestant
 Chuck Grigsby, American basketball player
 Denver Grigsby, Major League Baseball outfielder
 Elisenda Grigsby, American mathematician
 Gary Grigsby, American game designer
 George Barnes Grigsby, delegate to the United States House of Representatives from the Territory of Alaska
 Hugh Blair Grigsby, Virginia statesman and historian
 J. Eugene Grigsby, American multimedia artist
 Jill S. Grigsby, American sociologist
 John Grigsby, captain in the United States Army, leader in the Bear Flag Revolt and the Grigsby-Ide Party
 Lewis Grigsby, American real estate investor
 Margaret E. Grigsby, African American woman physician
 Melvin Grigsby, Attorney General of South Dakota
 Michael Grigsby, British filmmaker
 Nic Grigsby, Canadian football running back
 Nicholas Grigsby (American football), American football linebacker
 Noel Grigsby, American football wide receiver
 Otis Grigsby, American football defensive end
 Pearl Grigsby Richardson, American educator, clubwoman
 Sandy Grigsby, public speaker and photographer
 Sarah Lincoln Grigsby, sister of Abraham Lincoln
 Sioux K. Grigsby, Lieutenant Governor of South Dakota
 Tamara Grigsby, representative for the Wisconsin State Assembly
 Wayne Grigsby, Canadian screenwriter and producer
 Will Grigsby, American IBF light flyweight champion boxer

See also
Grigsby, Kentucky

References

Surnames of British Isles origin
English toponymic surnames